Ralph Scott Davis Jr. (January 21, 1920 – August 14, 2016) was an American college football coach. He was head coach of the Portland State Vikings football program in Portland, Oregon. He held the position for the 1955 and 1956 seasons and ended with a record of 4 wins, 11 losses, and 1 tie.

Davis found greater success as a track and field coach at the school. He was head coach from 1954 through 1970 and produced two national champions during that time. The school named him to their "Athletic Hall of Fame" in 1998. He retired from coaching in 1970 to devote full-time efforts to teaching at the school. David died in 2016, aged 96.

Head coaching record

Football

References

1920 births
2016 deaths
Portland State Vikings football coaches
Portland State Vikings track and field coaches
Sportspeople from Portland, Oregon